The Portland Bight Protected Area (PBPA) was created by the Jamaican government in 1999 to protect a large marine and terrestrial area on the island of Jamaica located southwest of Kingston. Nearby cays such as Little Goat Island are included. It is the largest protected area in Jamaica and comprises . Although the first priority in forming the protected area was to protect the coral reefs, it also serves to protect vulnerable and endemic species.  The PBPA includes  of wetlands on the island, and coastlines of mangroves, as well as sea-grass beds that serve as a nursery for fish and shellfish breeding. The Caribbean Coastal Area Management Foundation (C-CAM) has been charged with managing zones within the protected area.

Part of the task in forming the PBPA going forward is to find a balance between protecting the ecosystem from destruction by economic development and allowing the human inhabitants a means to live and work.

As of August 29, 2013, the PNP Government of Jamaica is proposing to develop the Goat Islands, in the PBPA, as a transhipment hub in conjunction with the Chinese government. Environmentalists argue that this will have a severe impact on the entire protected area.

As of September 23, 2016, the current Prime Minister, Andrew Holness of the JLP, has stated that the Goat Islands are no longer being considered as a base for a transhipment hub.

See also
 Hellshire Hills

References

External links
Portland Protected Area

Environment of Jamaica